Joseph Flaherty may refer to:

 Joseph A. Flaherty Jr. (1930–2018), vice president at CBS
 Joseph A. Flaherty (1916–1993), priest and president of Villanova University